Perak Turf Club is the major Thoroughbred horse racing facility in Ipoh, Perak, Malaysia. The Club is a part of the Malayan Racing Association. 
The Perak Turf Club was established in 1884; it was the first exclusive turf club ever built in Perak. The establishment of the Perak Turf Club at Taiping was the idea of Sir Frank Swettenham, who was passionate about horse racing. The new race course was located at Waterfall Road, later changed to Race Course Road, near the Lake Gardens. It held ordinary racing in the Federated Malay States—the major tournaments held at Penang, Selangor or Singapore. In 1906, it had a membership of about 250. The present course is at Waterfall Road, Taiping, which is 7 furlongs in length. There was an old course, situated about three miles away from Taiping, at which the current races were then run. In 1886, Burma ponies provided most of the racing and the meetings were primarily social functions. The turf club was the only club that attracted people of all classes, especially the Chinese, to mingle around, because of the sweepstakes and lotteries, as they preferred to gamble as their favourite pastime. Sir E.W. Birch, a racing enthusiast, would travel to distant Turf Clubs just to join the major tournament, and was crucial to developing racing interest in the area. In 1934, when the importance of Taiping had declined below that of Ipoh, the club was shifted to Ipoh, still bearing the same name.

The Club's major annual races are:
 Perak Coronation Cup 
 Perak Derby
 Sultan Gold Vase

References
 The Perak Turf club at Turfonline.com
Taiping Clubs

1884 establishments in British Malaya
Turf clubs in Malaysia
Buildings and structures in Ipoh
Sports venues in Perak